This is a list of Greek actors.

Alekos Alexandrakis – (Αλέκος Αλεξανδράκης) (1928–2005)
Anthimos Ananiadis – (Άνθιμος Ανανιάδης) (1985–)  
Jennifer Aniston – (Ιωάννα Αναστασάκη) (1969–)
John Aniston – (Ιωάννης Αναστασάκης) (1933-2022)  
Vasilis Avlonitis – (Βασίλης Αυλωνίτης) (1904–1970) 
Georges Corraface – (Γιώργος Χωραφάς) (1952–)
Cybele – (Κυβέλη) (1887–1978)
Jacques Damala – (Aριστεíδης Δαμαλάς) (1855–1889)
Rika Dialina – (Ειρήνη "Ρίκα" Διαλυνά) (1931–)
Lavrentis Dianellos – (Λαυρέντης Διανέλλος) (1911–1978)
Andreas Douzos – (Ανδρέας Ντούζος) (1936–2013) 
Chronis Exarhakos – (Χρόνης Εξαρχάκος) (1932–1984)
Giorgos Fountas – (Γιώργος Φούντας) (1924–2010) 
Tasos Giannopoulos – (Τάσος Γιαννόπουλος) (1931–1977) 
Giannis Gionakis – (Γιάννης Γκιωνάκης) (1922–2002)
Angelos Grammenos – (Άγγελος Γραμμένος) (1958–) 
Stathis Giallelis – (Στάθης Γιαλελής) (1941–)   
Kostas Hatzichristos – (Κώστας Χατζηχρήστος) (1921–2001) 
Antonis Kafetzopoulos – (Αντώνης Καφετζόπουλος) (1951–)
Tzeni Karezi – (Τζένη Καρέζη) (1932–1992) 
Kostas Kazakos – (Κώστας Καζάκος) (1935–2022)
Smaragda Karydi – (Σμαράγδα Καρύδη) (1969–)
Kora Karvouni – (Κόρα Καρβούνη) (1980–)
Vangelis Kazan – (Βαγγέλης Καζάν) (1936–2008)
Vassili Karis – (Βασίλης Καραμεσίνης) (1938–) 
Manos Katrakis – (Μάνος Κατράκης) (1908–1984)
Lambros Konstantaras – (Λάμπρος Κωσταντάρας) (1913–1985) 
Giorgos Konstantinou – (Γιώργος Κωνσταντίνου) (1934–)
Elias Koteas – (Ηλίας Κοτέας) (1961–)
Pavlos Kourtidis – (Παύλος Κουρτίδης) (1975–)
Zoe Laskari – (Ζωή Λάσκαρη) (1943–2017)
Thanos Leivaditis – (Θάνος Λειβαδίτης) (1934–2005)  
Zeta Makrypoulia – (Ζέτα Μακρυπούλια) (1978–)
Costas Mandylor – (Κώστας Θεοδοσόπουλος) (1965–)
Louis Mandylor – (Λούης Θεοδοσόπουλος) (1966–) 
Melina Mercouri – (Μελίνα Μερκούρη) (1920–1994)
Giannis Michalopoulos – (Γιάννης Μιχαλόπουλος (1927–2016)
Panos Mihalopoulos – (Πάνος Μιχαλόπουλος) (1949–) 
Memos Mpegnis – (Mέμος Μπεγνής) (1974–)
Elena Nathanael – (Έλενα Ναθαναήλ) (1947–2008)
Dimitris Nikolaidis – (Δημήτρης Νικολαΐδης) (1922–1993) 
Dinos Iliopoulos – (Ντίνος Ηλιόπουλος) (1913 – 2001) 
Clio-Danae Othoneou – (Κλειώ-Δανάη Οθωναίου) (1979–) 
Dionysis Papagiannopoulos – (Διονύσης Παπαγιαννόπουλος) (1912–1984)
Dimitris Papamichael – (Δημήτρης Παπαμιχαήλ) (1934–2004)
Irene Papas – (Ειρήνη Παππά) (1926–2022)
Katina Paxinou – (Κατίνα Παξινού) (1900–1973)
Anna Rezan – (Άννα Ρεζάν) (1992–)
Nikos Rizos – (Νίκος Ρίζος) (1924–1999)
Telly Savalas – (Τέλης Σαβάλας) (1922–1994)
Kostas Triantafyllopoulos – (Κώστας Τριανταφυλλόπουλος) (1956–2021) 
Titos Vandis (Τίτος Βανδής) (1907–2003) 
Aimilios Veakis – (Αιμίλιος Βεάκης) (1884–1951)
Antigone Valakou – (Αντιγόνη Βαλάκου) (1930–2013) 
Nora Valsami – (Νορα Βαλσάμη) (1948–)
Thanassis Veggos – (Θανάσσης Βέγγος) (1927–2011)
Giorgos Velentzas – (Γιώργος Βελέντζας) (1927–2015)
Rena Vlahopoulou – (Ρένα Βλαχοπούλου) (1923–2004) 
Giannis Voglis – (Γιάννης Βόγλης) (1937–2016)  
Lefteris Voyatzis – (Λευτέρης Βογιατζής) (1945–2013) 
Yorgo Voyagis – (Γιώργος Βογιατζής) (1945–) 
Aliki Vougiouklaki – (Αλίκη Βουγιουκλάκη) (1934–1996) 
Nikos Xanthopoulos – (Νίκος Ξανθόπουλος) (1934–2023) 
Pantelis Zervos – (Παντελής Ζερβός) (1908–1982)   
Voula Zouboulaki – (Βούλα Ζουμπουλάκη) (1924–2015)

Greek actors
Actors